John W. Smithson Field is a baseball venue in Merion Station, Pennsylvania, United States. It is home to the Saint Joseph's Hawks baseball team of the NCAA Division I Atlantic 10 Conference. The field hosted its first game in spring 2012. The venue has a capacity of 400 spectators. It is named for John Smithson, Saint Joseph's alumni and once interim president of Saint Joseph's University.

History
Construction began in June, 2011, and the venue was scheduled to be completed for the start of the 2012 season. On March 9, 2012, the Hawks defeated the Iona Gaels 5–1, in the first ever game at Smithson Field.

Features
The stadium features a press box, clubhouse, indoor hitting facility, suites and stadium lighting.

See also
 List of NCAA Division I baseball venues

References

External links
St. Joseph's Hawks

College baseball venues in the United States
Baseball venues in Pennsylvania
Saint Joseph's Hawks baseball